In mathematics, a group is supersolvable (or supersoluble) if it has an invariant normal series where all the factors are cyclic groups.  Supersolvability is stronger than the notion of solvability.

Definition

Let G be a group. G is supersolvable if there exists a normal series

By contrast, for a solvable group the definition requires each quotient to be abelian. As every finite solvable group is polycyclic, this can be seen as one of the key differences between the definitions. For a concrete example, the alternating group on four points, is solvable but not supersolvable.

Basic Properties

Some facts about supersolvable groups:

 Supersolvable groups are always polycyclic, and hence solvable.
 Every finitely generated nilpotent group is supersolvable.
 Every metacyclic group is supersolvable.
 The commutator subgroup of a supersolvable group is nilpotent.
 Subgroups and quotient groups of supersolvable groups are supersolvable.
 A finite supersolvable group has an invariant normal series with each factor cyclic of prime order.
 In fact, the primes can be chosen in a nice order: For every prime p, and for π the set of primes greater than p, a finite supersolvable group has a unique Hall π-subgroup. Such groups are sometimes called ordered Sylow tower groups.
 Every group of square-free order, and every group with cyclic Sylow subgroups (a Z-group), is supersolvable.
 Every irreducible complex representation of a finite supersolvable group is monomial, that is, induced from a linear character of a subgroup. In other words, every finite supersolvable group is a monomial group.
Every maximal subgroup in a supersolvable group has prime index.
A finite group is supersolvable if and only if every maximal subgroup has prime index.
A finite group is supersolvable if and only if every maximal chain of subgroups has the same length.  This is important to those interested in the lattice of subgroups of a group, and is sometimes called the Jordan–Dedekind chain condition.
 By Baum's theorem, every supersolvable finite group has a DFT algorithm running in time O(n log n).

References
Schenkman, Eugene. Group Theory. Krieger, 1975.
Schmidt, Roland. Subgroup Lattices of Groups. de Gruyter, 1994.
Keith Conrad,  SUBGROUP SERIES II, Section 4 , http://www.math.uconn.edu/~kconrad/blurbs/grouptheory/subgpseries2.pdf

Solvable groups